Tilly Lynde (October 9, 1782March 1, 1857) was an American merchant, judge, and politician in the U.S. state of New York.  He was a member of the New York State Senate (1820–1826) and the State Assembly (1818, 1826, & 1828), and was the father of U.S. congressman William Pitt Lynde.

Biography
Tilly Lynde was born in Brookfield, Massachusetts, in October 1782.  He moved to Sherburne, New York, in 1802, working as a clerk for the merchant Garret Y. Lansing.  By December 1804, Lynde had earned enough to start his own general store.  By all reports, he was extremely successful in business and within a decade was a prominent and well-known member of the community.

He was elected associate judge in 1816 and retired from his merchandise business.  The following year, he was elected to the New York State Assembly as one of three representatives of Chenango County.  He was defeated running for re-election in 1818, but was subsequently elected to the New York State Senate in 1820.  He served in the 44th and 45th legislatures, the last sessions before the adoption of the 1822 New York Constitution.  Under the new system, he was elected to a three year term in the New York Senate in 1822, representing the 6th State Senate district.  He was then elected to two more terms in the Assembly, serving in the 1826 and 1828 sessions.  He ran for United States House of Representatives in 1832, but was defeated.

He moved to Cortland, New York, in 1832, and later in life moved to Brooklyn, New York, where he lived with his youngest son.  He died in Brooklyn on March 1, 1857.

Personal life and family
Tilly Lynde was one of at least four children of John Lynde and his wife Sarah ( Warner).  Tilly's younger brother, Charles W. Lynde, also served in the New York State Senate.

Tilly Lynde married Eliza Warner, a school teacher from Sunderland, Massachusetts, on September 10, 1812.  They had four sons.  Two of their sons, Charles and Watts, died along with 250 other passengers in the fire aboard the steamboat Erie, en route to Chicago in 1841.  Their eldest surviving son, William Pitt Lynde, moved to Milwaukee, Wisconsin Territory, where he became attorney general of the territory, then United States attorney.  After Wisconsin achieved statehood, William Pitt Lynde was elected to three terms in the United States House of Representatives, and was elected mayor of Milwaukee in 1860.

Electoral history

New York Assembly (1817, 1818)

| colspan="6" style="text-align:center;background-color: #e9e9e9;"| General Election, April 1817 (vote for three)

| colspan="6" style="text-align:center;background-color: #e9e9e9;"| General Election, April 1818 (vote for three)

New York Senate (1820, 1822)

| colspan="6" style="text-align:center;background-color: #e9e9e9;"| General Election, April 1820 (vote for three)

| colspan="6" style="text-align:center;background-color: #e9e9e9;"| General Election, September 1822 (vote for four)

References

External links
 

|-

1782 births
1857 deaths
People from Sherburne, New York
Members of the New York State Assembly
New York (state) state senators
New York (state) lawyers
19th-century American politicians
Burials at Green-Wood Cemetery